East Peoria District 86 is a 7-school primary school district located in East Peoria, Illinois.  As of the 2014–2015 school year, East Peoria School District 86 has 1689 students.  East Peoria District 86 currently has several  schools under its administration: Central Junior High School, Armstrong Grade School, Shute Grade School, Lincoln Grade School, Glendale Grade School, Wilson Grade School, and Bolin Grade School.

Additions
During late 2009 and beginning 2010 Central Junior High School underwent construction on a new cafeteria, gym, band and chorus room, and teachers' lounge.   

During 2014 and 2015, Central Junior High School underwent a major reconstruction of classrooms, computer labs, and a library.

References

External links 
 Official website

Education in Tazewell County, Illinois
School districts in Illinois
East Peoria, Illinois
school districts established in 1900
1900 establishments in Illinois